Rocky Fuentes is a Filipino professional boxer.

He has twice fought for flyweight world boxing title.  He lost to Amnat Ruenroeng for the International Boxing Federation world title.  He also lost to Román González for the World Boxing Council world title.

Fuentes also has a loss to Richie Mepranum by split decision.

References 

1986 births
Flyweight boxers
Living people
Filipino male boxers